Corey Josiah Paul Blackett-Taylor (born 23 September 1997) is an English professional footballer who plays for Charlton Athletic. He has represented England at Under-19 level.

Career

Aston Villa 
Blackett-Taylor joined Aston Villa and worked his way up through the team's academy age groups. In the 2015–16 season he scored five goals in his opening nine matches for the Villa Under-18s side and was later selected for the annual international seven-a-side tournament, the Hong Kong Soccer Sevens, which Villa won for the record sixth time. He was named on the first team bench for a Football League Cup match against Notts County by Tim Sherwood in August 2015 but did not take part. Villa won 5–3 in extra time.

Blackett-Taylor was named on the bench for a league match the first time on 7 March 2017 and replaced Neil Taylor to make his debut in the 87th minute in a 1–0 loss to Huddersfield.

Tranmere Rovers 
On 26 June 2019, Blackett-Taylor signed a two-year contract with newly promoted League One side Tranmere Rovers. He made his debut on 17 September 2019, in a 2–2 home draw against Peterborough United. Blackett-Taylor scored his first professional goal on 13 October 2019, a late winner in a 1–0 away victory over Coventry City. 

Blackett-Taylor left Tranmere at the end of his contract in July 2021.

Charlton Athletic 
On 20 August 2021, Blackett-Taylor joined Charlton Athletic on a short-term deal until January 2022. He scored his first goal for Charlton in a 6–1 EFL Trophy tie victory against Crawley Town on 31 August 2021.

On 18 November 2021, it was announced that Blackett-Taylor had signed an extension to his contract at Charlton Athletic until at least 2023.

Personal life
Blackett-Taylor attended Handsworth Grammar School and donated both an England and Aston Villa shirt to the school having signed his first professional contract with Villa in 2016. His older brother, Daryl Taylor, is a former professional footballer and strength coach.

Career statistics

Honours
Aston Villa U23s

 Premier League Cup: 2017–18

Tranmere Rovers
EFL Trophy runner-up: 2020–21

References

External links

1997 births
Living people
English footballers
England youth international footballers
Association football forwards
Aston Villa F.C. players
Walsall F.C. players
Tranmere Rovers F.C. players
Charlton Athletic F.C. players
English Football League players